was a Japanese runner. He competed at the 1936 Olympics in the 5000 metres and 10,000 metres events and finished fourth on both occasions.

Murakoso graduated from the Chuo University and then worked at Kawasaki Heavy Industries. After World War II he demobilized from the Army and worked as an athletics reporter for Mainichi Shimbun. He also helped prepare the national athletics team to the 1952 Olympics. He died of acute respiratory failure, aged 92.

References

1905 births
1998 deaths
Japanese male long-distance runners
Olympic male long-distance runners
Olympic athletes of Japan
Athletes (track and field) at the 1936 Summer Olympics
Japan Championships in Athletics winners
New Zealand Athletics Championships winners